Club Deportivo Loeches is a football club based in Loeches in the Community of Madrid. Founded in 1968, it plays in the Primera Categoría Aficionados. Its stadium is Cruz de Piedra  with a capacity of 1,500 seats, in Loeches.

Season to season

0 seasons in Tercera División

External links
Futmadrid profile
Madrid FA profile

Football clubs in the Community of Madrid
Divisiones Regionales de Fútbol clubs
Association football clubs established in 1968
1968 establishments in Spain